County Road 956 is a  road in Sortland Municipality in Nordland County, Norway.

It starts near the village of Vik, where it branches off to the north from County Road 820 and then follows the west side of Sortlandsundet strait to the village of Bremnes.

History
Originally, small roads were built between the farms in the area, like many other places in Vesterålen. The interconnecting road between these farm roads and  the whole way around the Gåsfjorden was built in 1930. Later, the road was assigned the status of a county road. The side road to Holm was also classified as a county road, but it was downgraded to a municipal road in the 1980s. The road to Bremnes was asphalted in the late 1980s and early 1990s. The road to Holm is still paved with gravel.

The road along the south side of Gåsfjorden was formerly often closed in the winter due to snow. In the early 1990s the road was widened and some embankments were built, eliminating the problem with the snow.

County Road 956 has some heavy traffic because of waste transportation to the dump run by the waste company Reno-Vest in Bremnes.

References

External links
Statens vegvesen – trafikkmeldinger Fv956 (Traffic Information: County Road 956)

956
Nordland
Sortland